Two Gun Sheriff is a 1941 American Western film directed by George Sherman, written by Doris Schroeder, and starring Don "Red" Barry, Lynn Merrick, Jay Novello, Lupita Tovar, Milton Kibbee and Fred Kohler Jr. It was released on April 10, 1941, by Republic Pictures.

Plot

Cast 
Don "Red" Barry as Jim McKinnon the Sundown Kid / Bruce McKinnon
Lynn Merrick as Ruth Norton
Jay Novello as Marc Albo
Lupita Tovar as Nita
Milton Kibbee as Deputy Jones
Fred Kohler Jr. as Henchman Buck Keller
Marin Sais as Mrs. McKinnon
Fred Toones as Snowflake 
Dirk Thane as Henchman Duke
Arch Hall, Sr. as Henchman Dunn
Charles Thomas as Tex Calhoun
Lee Shumway as Sheriff Blake

References

External links
 

1941 films
1940s English-language films
American Western (genre) films
1941 Western (genre) films
Republic Pictures films
Films directed by George Sherman
American black-and-white films
1940s American films